Sekove Ravoka (born 27 June 1986) is a Fijian cricketer and a former captain of the Fiji cricket team. Outside of cricket, Ravoka is also a police officer, and joined the Fiji Police Force in July 2020.

In 2013, he was selected for the East-Asia Pacific team that played in the Australian Country Cricket Championship. Ravoka has worked with Cricket Fiji in visiting schools in Australia.

He played in the 2015 ICC World Cricket League Division Six tournament. In August 2018, he was named as the captain of Fiji's squad for Group A of the 2018–19 ICC World Twenty20 East Asia-Pacific Qualifier tournament. In April 2021, Ravoka was named in a Fiji's training squad ahead of the 2021 ICC Men's T20 World Cup East Asia-Pacific Qualifier tournament in Japan. In July 2022, he was named in Fiji's Twenty20 International (T20I) squad for the 2022 ICC Men's T20 World Cup East Asia-Pacific Qualifier A in Vanuatu. He made his T20I debut on 9 September 2022 against Vanuatu.

References

External links
 

1986 births
Living people
Fijian cricketers
Fiji Twenty20 International cricketers
Fijian police officers
Place of birth missing (living people)
Wicket-keepers